Four square is a team sport played among two teams with two players each on a square court divided into four quadrants: A, B, C, and D (usually numbers 3, 4, 2, and 1, respectively, depending on the court.) The square that a player gets to before anyone else immediately becomes their position in the game. The objective of four square is to eliminate players on the opposing team to achieve the highest rank on the court, and this is done by bouncing the ball back and forth between quadrants. A player on one team may bounce the ball to an opponent team's player's square, and tries to bounce the ball in a state that the player on the opposing team can not hit it to another square. The winning team will move up in the ranks, and the team that reaches the highest rank, A (usually number 3 on numbered courts depending on the court), first, wins, with all the losing team's players being eliminated. A player is eliminated when a ball is bounced in a player's quadrant and the player is unable to bounce the ball into another player's quadrant. It is a popular game at elementary schools with little required equipment, almost no setup, and short rounds of play that can be ended at any time.

Playing environment
Four square is played on any hard-surfaced court, such as wood, concrete or asphalt. Each of the four squares has a rank and is occupied by a single player. The ranks may be arranged so that either the highest ranking square is positioned facing the lowest ranking square, or the ranks increase as one moves clockwise (or counterclockwise).
                             
The lines on the court are boundaries. The interior lines separating player squares are out of bounds. The ball may not touch any portion of an inside line or the player who hit the ball is in error. The lines marking the outermost edges of the court are typically considered in-bounds. These boundary rules are often described as "inside out, outside in." In recreational play, and even with a judge in tournament play, it is often difficult to determine if the ball hits the line.

Ball usage
However, other sizes and types of balls can be used.

During regular play, or "classic," the ball must be hit with the player's hands only.

In classic play, carrying, catching, or holding the ball during play is not allowed, although putting spin on the ball is allowed as long as carrying does not occur. Prolonged contact with the ball can give players unfair control over the play. Hitting the ball must create a perceptible change in the ball's velocity (speed or direction).

Elimination
Players may be eliminated from the court because of errors or fouls they commit. Eliminated players leave the court, the remaining players move up to the next highest square, and a new player joins the court in the lowest square. Eliminated players wait in line for their next turn.

The following actions may result in elimination (although many variations exist):

 Failing to hit the ball into another square
 Missing the ball
 Hitting the ball into your own square
 Hitting the ball out of turn
 Hitting the ball with a prohibited body part
 Hitting the ball out of bounds (or onto an internal boundary line)
 Hitting the ball before it touches the ground

Game scalability
Four square is a popular game for children and school playgrounds. It is possible to scale the game's difficulty and supervision appropriately for different age groups and ability levels. Schools, churches, and camps often change the size of the court, the type of ball, or aspects of the rules to create variation in play or to suit the players' abilities.

Similar games 
Four square has inspired other similar games. One example is nine square where instead of the grid being two-by-two, it is three-by-three. The king court is in the middle and the ball is served from this position. The rules are similar in how the ball is passed between players by bouncing between squares. Other branches of the game have been popularized in recent years which are played on an aerial grid. It is similar to the original in that four or nine people play in their respective spots, but they must keep the ball off the ground like in volleyball. Rotation and rules are similar to each grounded rendition. 

The game is also similar to Handball.

History
Four square dates back to at least the 1950s. A game called "four square" is mentioned in newspapers at least as far back as the 1950s, although the rules are not explained.

Four Square is described with the same rules used today in a 1953 teacher's manual.

The game is known as "King Out" in Sweden, and many players refer to the person in the server square as the "king."

World championships

The Four Square World Championships, is a regional competitive adult four square tournament, which takes place in Bridgton, Maine, USA, each winter season. The Lakes Environmental Association hosts this annual winter fundraiser to support their environment in the lakes region of Maine, USA. The competition draws athletes from the US and Canada, and has registered competitors from Israel to Bermuda. , The results of the February 24, 2018, competition are:

 2020 Men's World Champion, Alec Douglas, Norway, Maine, USA
 2018 Women's World Champion, Brittany Dunay, Maine, USA
 2018 Men's World Champion, Christian Housh, Cambridge, Massachusetts, USA
 2018 Women's Junior World Champion, Penny Housh, Cambridge, Massachusetts, USA
 2018 Men's Junior World Champion, Sabian Hallin, Maine, USA

Prior world championships have been held in January or February from 2005 through 2018.

World records
On August 4–5, 2012, a core group of 17 Needham High School students and alumni — assisted by 50 other Needham residents at various times — broke the previous world record by playing for 34 hours, the previous record being held by 15 Manchester College students who played the game for 30 hours. The world record was previously held by eight Argentinean players for 29 hours in 2008, as recognized by Guinness World Records. The Argentinean record was preceded by a group of teens from Youngstown, OH who also played for 29 hours.

See also

Russian four square
Wallball
Roundnet
Handball (schoolyard game)

References
.

External links
 Official rules

Children's games
Ball games